Ronald Schmidt (born 28 April 1977) is a German footballer who plays for SV Erlbach.

External links

1977 births
Living people
German footballers
Dresdner SC players
VFC Plauen players
SV Wacker Burghausen players
2. Bundesliga players
3. Liga players
Association football midfielders
People from Freital
Footballers from Saxony